Vrinners is a village in Denmark on Djursland, with a population of 389 (1 January 2022), located on the peninsula of Mols, 9 km south of Rønde and 3 km north of Knebel. The village is located in the Central Denmark Region and belongs to the Syddjurs Municipality. Vrinners is located in Rolsø Parish. Vrinners church is located in Vrinners.

External links 
 Vrinners Residents

References 

Villages in Denmark
Syddjurs Municipality